is a stable of sumo wrestlers, one of the Nishonoseki ichimon or group of stables. It was founded in its modern form on 1 October 1994 by Masurao Hiroo, who branched off from the now defunct Oshiogawa stable. As of January 2023, the stable had 13 wrestlers.



The stable first wrestler to reach the top makuuchi division was Katayama in 2005. The now retired Wakakōyū reached komusubi in 2012, as did Ōnoshō in 2017. The stable's most successful foreign recruit has been the Russian former maegashira Amūru, who retired in 2018. 
In January 2010 the stable, along with the Takanohana, Ōtake and Magaki stable, was forced to leave the Nishonoseki ichimon after former yokozuna Takanohana declared his intention to run as an unofficial candidate in the elections to the Sumo Association's board of directors. The ejected stables formed their own group, which gained ichimon status of its own in 2014.  This was dissolved in 2018, with the Ōnomatsu, Ōtake and Chiganoura stables briefly forming Ōnomatsu ichimon before aligning themselves once again with the Nishonoseki group. Masurao resigned from the Japan Sumo Association for health reasons on 26 September 2019 and was replaced by the former maegashira Daidō. 

On 26 December, the Japan Sumo Association announced the stable recruited Batjargal Choijirsuren, a Mongolian-born Student Yokozuna, and allowed him to use the makushita tsukedashi system and enter his first official tournament at the rank of makushita 15.

Owner
2019–present 13th Ōnomatsu, (shunin, former maegashira Daidō)
1994-2019: 12th Ōnomatsu, former sekiwake Masurao)

Notable active wrestlers

Ōnoshō (best rank komusubi)

Coach
Shiranui Masaya (iin, former komusubi Wakakōyū)

Notable former members
Wakakōyū (best rank komusubi)
Amūru (best rank maegashira)
Daidō (best rank maegashira)
Katayama (best rank maegashira)

Usher
Jin (jonokuchi yobidashi, real name Jin Sekimoto)

Hairdresser
Tokotaka (1st class tokoyama)
Tokoyū (4th class tokoyama)

Location and access
Chiba prefecture, Narashino city, Saginuma 5-5-14
10 minutes from Makuharihongō Station on Sōbu Main Line and Keisei Chiba Line

See also 
List of sumo stables
List of active sumo wrestlers
List of past sumo wrestlers
Glossary of sumo terms

References

External links 
Official site 
Japan Sumo Association profile

Active sumo stables